Setesdal (older name: Sætersdal) is a valley and a traditional district in Agder County in southern Norway. It consists of the municipalities of Bykle, Valle, Bygland, Iveland, and Evje og Hornnes.

The Otra river flows through the valley of Setesdal into the sea near Kristiansand. It flows southward from the Hardangervidda plateau in Telemark. The historic Setesdal starts at Evje and extends as far as the farm Bjåen, at the edge of the traditional region of Telemark. Øvre (Upper) Setesdal is in the municipality of Bykle. The municipalities of Iveland, Evje & Hornes and Bygland comprise the Nedre (Lower) Setesdal. Valle municipality is in the middle of the Setesdal valley. Norwegian National Road 9 runs through Setesdal.

Etymology 
The oldest Norse form of the name was just Setr, and this was later replaced by Setrsdalr ('the dale/valley of Setr'). The common word setr has the meaning 'homestead, farm' – and Setr was probably originally the name of an old, large farm in the central part of Valle. The old farm was then later divided into a lot of smaller parts, but the name survived as the name of the district.

History 
The Historia Norwegiæ, a short history of Norway written by a monk in the second half of the 12th century, reports that Setesdal was then part of the law district "Telemark with Råbyggelag". A Raabygger or Råbygger is one who lives in a corner; this is an apt description for the valley of Setesdal, which runs like a wedge into the heights of the mountain called Haukelifjell.

Ascending the Otra valley from Evje, one reaches the lake Byglandsfjord. At this point one historically found one of the more pronounced cultural transitions in Norway; there was a radical change in racial characteristics, dress (folk costumes or Bunad), architecture, dialect, folk music, dance (e.g., the ganger, a form of Bygdedans), customs, and cuisine. Particularly obvious north of the mountain pass of Byklestigen, the people of upper Setesdal were observed to be more closely related in blood and speech to their eastern neighbours in Telemark, as well as their immediate neighbours in adjoining districts of Rogaland to the west than to those people down the valley.

Between Valle in Setesdal on the western side of the mountains and Fyresdal on the eastern side, one finds a medieval trail that priests and bishops used to get between the counties of Agder and Telemark. This trail is named "The Bishop's Road"(Bispevegen) and every year a march called "The Bishop's Road March" (Bispevegmarsjen) starts at Kleivgrend in Fyresdal.

The Hylestad stave church, constructed in the 13th century in Setesdal, was demolished in the 17th century. Its portal, with several carved scenes illustrating the legend of Sigurd Fåvnesbane (Sigurd the Dragon-slayer), is on display at the University Museum of National Antiquities in Oslo (Universitetets Oldsaksamling, Historisk Museum, Oslo). Sigurd's slaying of Fafnir is described in the Prose Edda of Snorri Sturluson and the Völsungasaga as well as alluded to in Beowulf and Njáls saga.

The Setesdal Line is a railroad between Kristiansand and Byglandsfjord in southern Norway. It was opened to Hægeland in 1895, and to Byglandsfjord in 1896. This railroad was closed down in 1962 but parts of it exist today as a hobby railroad and it is in regular tourist use during the summer months.

The SS Bjoren is an old steamboat that is in regular tourist use on a lake in the river Otra called Byglandsfjord.

See also 
 Setesdalsbunad
 Setesdalsgenser ("Setesdal sweater")
 Setesdølen, local paper

References

Other sources 
 South Norway by Frank Noel Stagg, George Allen & Unwin, Ltd., 1958.

External links 

 Setesdal www.visitnorway.com

 
Districts of Agder
Valleys of Agder